Search engine evaluation is covered by multiple articles:
 Comparison of web search engines, which is qualitative and lists the qualities of popular search engines
 Evaluation measures (information retrieval), which is quantitative and which describes general methods by which any search engine results might be evaluated